The Fortunian age marks the beginning of the Phanerozoic Eon, the Paleozoic Era, and the Cambrian Period. It is the first of the two stages of the Terreneuvian series. Its base is defined as the first appearance of the trace fossil Treptichnus pedum  million years ago. The top of the Fortunian which is the base of the Stage 2 of the Cambrian has not been formally defined yet, but will correspond to the appearance of an Archeocyatha species or "Small shelly fossils" approximately  million years ago.

The name Fortunian is derived from a part of the Burin Peninsula, the town of Fortune near the GSSP and Fortune Bay.

GSSP
The type locality (GSSP) of the Fortunian stage is in Fortune Head, at the northern edge of the Burin Peninsula, Newfoundland, Canada. This GSSP coincides with the base of the Terreneuvian series, the Precambrian-Cambrian boundary and the beginning of the Phanerozoic. The outcrops show a carbonate-siliciclastic succession which is mapped as the Chapel Island Formation. The formation is divided into the following members that are composed of peritidal sandstones and shales (Member 1), muddy deltaic and shelf sandstones and mudstones (Member 2A), laminated siltstones (Member 2B and 3) and mudstones and limestones of the inner shelf (Member 4). The Precambrian-Cambrian boundary lies 2.4 m above the base of the 2nd member which is the lowest occurrence of Treptichnus pedum. The traces can be seen on the lower surface of the sandstone layers. The first calcareous shelled skeletal fossils (Ladatheca cylindrica) is 400 m above the boundary. The first trilobites appear 1,400 m above the boundary, which corresponds to the beginning of the Branchian Series.

See also
 Stratigraphy of the Cambrian

References

External links

Album of the Ichnia 2012 conference at Fortune Head

 
Cambrian geochronology
Geological ages
Cambrian Canada